Sieberhagen is a surname. Notable people with the surname include:

Jacobus Johannes Sieberhagen (born 1961), South African sculptor
Melt Sieberhagen, South African actor and comic